This is a list of models who were chosen as a Playboy Playmate of the Year for the American edition of Playboy magazine.

List of Playmates of the Year
1953: Marilyn Monroe
1954: 
1955: 
1956: 
1957:
1958: 
1959: 
1960: Ellen Stratton
1961: Linda Gamble
1962: Christa Speck
1963: June Cochran
1964: Donna Michelle
1965: Jo Collins
1966: Allison Parks
1967: Lisa Baker
1968: Angela Dorian
1969: Connie Kreski
1970: Claudia Jennings
1971: Sharon Clark
1972: Liv Lindeland
1973: Marilyn Cole
1974: Cyndi Wood
1975: Marilyn Lange
1976: Lillian Müller
1977: Patti McGuire
1978: Debra Jo Fondren
1979: Monique St. Pierre
1980: Dorothy Stratten
1981: Terri Welles
1982: Shannon Tweed
1983: Marianne Gravatte
1984: Barbara Edwards
1985: Karen Velez
1986: Kathy Shower
1987: Donna Edmondson
1988: India Allen
1989: Kimberley Conrad
1990: Reneé Tenison
1991: Lisa Matthews
1992: Corinna Harney
1993: Anna Nicole Smith
1994: Jenny McCarthy
1995: Julie Lynn Cialini
1996: Stacy Sanches
1997: Victoria Silvstedt
1998: Karen McDougal
1999: Heather Kozar
2000: Jodi Ann Paterson
2001: Brande Roderick
2002: Dalene Kurtis
2003: Christina Santiago
2004: Carmella DeCesare
2005: Tiffany Fallon
2006: Kara Monaco
2007: Sara Jean Underwood
2008: Jayde Nicole
2009: Ida Ljungqvist
2010: Hope Dworaczyk
2011: Claire Sinclair
2012: Jaclyn Swedberg
2013: Raquel Pomplun
2014: Kennedy Summers
2015: Dani Mathers
2016: Eugena Washington
2017: Brook Power
2018: Nina Daniele
2019: Jordan Emanuel
2020: Vendela, Megan Moore, Miki Hamano, Fo Porter, Abigail O'Neill, Yoli Lara, Teela LaRoux, Geena Rocero, Sophie O'Neil, Hilda Dias Pimentel, Gillian Chan, Jordy Murray

Playmates of the Year by original month of appearance

January
Connie Kreski (1968)
Liv Lindeland (1971)
Marilyn Cole (1972)
Kimberley Conrad (1988)
Heather Kozar (1998)
Jayde Nicole (2007)

February
Cyndi Wood (1973)
Julie Lyn Cialini (1994)

March
Stacy Sanches (1995)
Ida Ljungqvist (2008)

April
Linda Gamble (1960)
Lisa Matthews (1990)
Brande Roderick (2000)
Carmella DeCesare (2003)
Hope Dworaczyk (2009)
Jaclyn Swedberg (2011)
Raquel Pomplun (2012)
Nina Daniele (2017)

May
Marilyn Lange (1974)
Kathy Shower (1985)
Anna Nicole Smith (1992)
Dani Mathers  (2014)
Brook Power (2016)

June
Kara Monaco (2005)

July
Sara Jean Underwood (2006)

August
Sharon Clark (1970)
Lillian Müller (1975)
Dorothy Stratten (1979)
Corinna Harney (1991)
Christina Santiago (2002)

September
Christa Speck (1961)
Angela Dorian (1967)
Debra Jo Fondren (1977)
Barbara Edwards (1983)
Dalene Kurtis (2001)

October
Allison Parks (1965)
Marianne Gravatte (1982)
Jenny McCarthy (1993)
Jodi Ann Paterson (1999)
Claire Sinclair (2010)

November
Lisa Baker (1966)
Claudia Jennings (1969)
Patti McGuire (1977)
Monique St. Pierre (1978)
Shannon Tweed (1981)
Donna Edmondson (1986)
Renee Tenison (1989)

December
Ellen Stratton (1959)
June Cochran (1962)
Donna Michelle (1963)
Jo Collins (1964)
Terri Welles (1980)
Karen Velez (1984)
India Allen (1987)
Victoria Silvstedt (1996)
Karen McDougal (1997)
Tiffany Fallon (2004)
Kennedy Summers (2013)
Eugena Washington (2015)
Jordan Emanuel (2018)

See also
 List of Playboy Playmates of the Month
 Playboy Playmate
 List of Penthouse Pets

References

Playmates of the Year

Lists of female models
American female models

es:Anexo:Playmates